The 2021 season was Kelantan United's 6th year in their history and second season in the Malaysia Premier League since last year following promotion 2019 season. Along with the league, the club will also compete in the Malaysia Cup.

Events
On 27 December 2020, the club has announced the line-up for the 2021 Malaysia Premier League.

On 7 February 2021, Shuhei Fukai joined the club. Earlier, the club already signed Masashi Motoyama and Yuki Tanigawa while Gassama Alfussainey retained from last year.

On 25 May 2021, Zafuan Azeman joined the club from Penang on loan deal.

On 28 May 2021, it was announced that Ariusdius Jais dan Evan Wensley from Sabah will join the club on 6-month loan deal. 

On 19 July 2021, Nazrulerwan Makmor joined as club's new head coach. Akira Higashiyama has been appointed as club's technical director.

On 28 July 2021, Kelantan United won 4-0 over Perak II in a league match.

On 29 July 2021, Zafuan Azeman and Gassama Alfusainey sidelined from match against Johor Darul Ta'zim II after involved in fights after league match against Perak II.

Players

First-team squad

Competitions

Malaysia Premier League

League table

Matches

Malaysia Cup

Group stage

Statistics

Appearances and goals

|-
! colspan="10" style="background:#dcdcdc; text-align:center"| Goalkeepers

|-
! colspan="16" style="background:#dcdcdc; text-align:center"| Defenders

|-
! colspan="16" style="background:#dcdcdc; text-align:center"| Midfielders

|-
! colspan="16" style="background:#dcdcdc; text-align:center"| Forwards

|-
! colspan="16" style="background:#dcdcdc; text-align:center"| Players transferred out during the season

|-

References

2021
Kelantan United